C. I. Mahadevan 5 Adi 4 Inchu is a 2004  Malayalam comedy thriller film directed by K. K. Haridas and starring Cochin Haneefa, Shruti and Jagathy Sreekumar in pivotal roles.

Plot
Cochin Hanifa plays the title role of CI Mahadevan, who goes to a village where a bomb blast in a school bus has created terror in the hearts of the villagers. He is being assisted by a bunch of policemen working in the local police station. These policemen are more concerned about their personal matters than the problems faced by the public. How Mahadevan unravels the mystery behind the blast with the help of these policemen is the crux of the story.

Cast
 Cochin Haneefa as C.I. Mahadevan
 Shruti as Dr Lakshmi
 Jagathy Sreekumar as Head Constable Salgunan
 Kalabhavan Mani as C.I. Karimpuli Antony
 Harisree Ashokan as Constable Dasappan
 Indrans as Narayanan
 Rajan P. Dev as Nambiar
Spadikam George as DYSP
Prem Prakash as Minister
Kalabhavan Haneef as Varkey
Subair as Dr Willams
Manuraj as Jose
Meena Ganesh as C.I. Mahadevan's mother
Jolly Isho
Deepika Mohan
Omana Ouseph as Sr.Petresia

Soundtrack
The film's Music Director by Berni Ignatious. Lyrics by Gireesh Puthenchery.

References

External links
 

2000s Malayalam-language films
Films directed by K. K. Haridas
Films scored by Berny–Ignatius